
AD 35 (XXXV) was a common year starting on Saturday (link will display the full calendar) of the Julian calendar. At the time, it was known as the Year of the Consulship of Gallus and Nonianus (or, less frequently, year 788 Ab urbe condita). The denomination AD 35 for this year has been used since the early medieval period, when the Anno Domini calendar era became the prevalent method in Europe for naming years.

Events

By place

Roman Empire 
 Pliny the Elder is brought to Rome before this year.

Persia 
 Tiridates III becomes king of Parthia (until AD 36).

Births 
 Decimus Valerius Asiaticus, Roman senator and governor
 Gaius Nymphidius Sabinus, Roman prefect (approximate date)
 Marcus Fabius Quintilianus, Roman rhetorician (approximate date)
 Quintus Junius Arulenus Rusticus, Roman senator (d. AD 93)
 Statilia Messalina, Roman empress and wife of Nero (approximate date)

Deaths 
 Arsaces I (or Arshak I), Roman client king of Armenia
 Epaticcus, British prince of the Catuvellauni (approximate date)
 Gaius Poppaeus Sabinus, Roman statesman and consul
 Lucius Fulcinius Trio, Roman senator and suffect consul
 Phraates, Parthian prince and son of Phraates IV

References 

0035

als:30er#35